Aviad Bourla is an Israeli footballer playing for Maccabi Herzliya.

References

1993 births
Israeli Jews
Living people
Israeli footballers
Israel under-21 international footballers
Bnei Yehuda Tel Aviv F.C. players
Maccabi Netanya F.C. players
Hapoel Petah Tikva F.C. players
Hapoel Marmorek F.C. players
Maccabi Herzliya F.C. players
Footballers from Holon
Israeli people of Spanish-Jewish descent
Israeli Premier League players
Liga Leumit players
Association football midfielders